= Rhodes Colleges =

Rhodes Colleges may refer to:

- Rhodes College, a private, four-year liberal arts college in Memphis, Tennessee
- Rhodes College, the 2000–2002 name of Everest College (Missouri), a for-profit career college in Springfield, Missouri
